Supply chain engineering is the engineering discipline that concerns the planning, design, and operation of supply chains. Some of its main areas include logistics, production, and pricing. It involves various areas in mathematical modelling such as operations research, machine learning, and optimization, which are usually implemented using software.

Supply chain engineering draws heavily from, and overlaps with other engineering disciplines, such as industrial engineering, manufacturing engineering, systems engineering, information engineering, and software engineering. Although they have the same goals, supply chain engineering is focused on a mathematical model-based approach, whereas supply chain management is focused on a more traditional management and business-based one. Supply chain engineering can be considered to include supply chain optimization, although the latter could also be done using more qualitative management-based approaches, which is less of a focus in supply chain engineering.

Applications 
Supply chain engineering is applied to all parts of supply chains, including:
 Authentication and tracking, such as via RFID technology
 Financing
 Forecasting, particularly for demand
 Locating facilities
 Logistics for both goods and people
 Transportation
 Warehousing and inventory management
 Pricing
 Production and manufacturing

Techniques 
Supply chain engineering uses a wide variety of mathematical techniques such as:
 Control theory, and particularly optimal control
 Optimization
 Forecasting
 Time series analysis
 Machine learning and artificial intelligence
 Operations research
 Flow network analysis
 Inventory management
 Routing

See also 
 Supply chain finance

References